Rachel Lynne Mercik (born December 16, 1991) is an American professional soccer player who currently plays for Apollon Ladies F.C. in the Cypriot First Division (women). She previously played in the German Frauen-Bundesliga with 1. FFC Turbine Potsdam and the Swedish Damallsvenskan for Vittsjö GIK. Mercik has represented the United States on the under-16, under-17, under-20 and under-23 national soccer teams.

Early life
Raised in El Dorado Hills, California, Mercik attended Oak Ridge High School where she captained the varsity soccer team in 2009. She led the team in goals and assists and led her team to the 2009 Sac-Joaquin Section Division II championship and was subsequently named to the all-league first-team. As a senior in 2010, Mercik was ranked as the No. 18 player in the nation, according to the Top Drawer Soccer National Top-100 List, and earned a 2009 ESPN Spring All-America team honorable mention.

Mercik played club soccer for the CASA Boca Juniors as well as the MVLA Soccer club under coach Albertin Montoya.

University of California, Berkeley, 2010–2013
As a freshman in 2010, Mercik played in 12 of Cal's 20 games, starting four. She scored two goals and two assists. During her sophomore year, Mercik played in 20 of Cal's 22 games, starting 9, and added four goals and two assists. As a junior, Mercik played in every game for the Bears, starting 17 times, scored one goal and served four assists.  During her senior year, Mercik captained the team and started in all 21 games.  She ranked second on the team for goals (6) and assists (4)  and scored a golden goal against Cal's longtime rivals Stanford to help the Bears with their first win over Stanford in 7 years. Her collegiate accolades include Pac-12 Offensive Player of the Week, All-Pac-12 Honorable Mention, and Cal Women' Soccer team Offensive MVP of the 2013/2014 season.

Playing career

Club

1. FFC Turbine Potsdam, 2014–15 
Mercik joined German Frauen-Bundesliga club 1. FFC Turbine Potsdam in September 2014. The team reached the DFB-Pokal (women) final, losing to Wolfsburg 3-0.

Vittsjö GIK, 2016–2018 
Mercik signed with Vittsjö GIK on December 3, 2015 for the 2016 Damallsvenskan season, playing her first 90 minutes against IFK Kalmar in the Svenska Cupen (women) on February 18, 2016.

Apollon Ladies F.C., 2018–present 
In January 2018, Mercik signed with Apollon Ladies F.C.

International
Mercik represented the United States on the under-17 national soccer teal in 2007 during three-game friendly series in Argentina. She has also played for the under-16, under-17, under-20 and under-23 national soccer teams.

References

External links
 US Soccer player profile
 UC Berkeley player profile
 
 

1991 births
Living people
American expatriate soccer players in Germany
California Golden Bears women's soccer players
Expatriate women's footballers in Sweden
Vittsjö GIK players
Damallsvenskan players
1. FFC Turbine Potsdam players
Soccer players from California
Women's association football midfielders
People from El Dorado Hills, California
American women's soccer players
Apollon Limassol
Expatriate women's footballers in Cyprus
Apollon Ladies F.C. players